Scorchers are an Irish women's cricket team that compete in the Women's Super Series. The team has no geographical base, instead being made up of some of the best players from across Ireland. They are captained by Gaby Lewis and coached by Glenn Querl. They have won six Super Series tournaments.

History
Scorchers were established in 2015 to compete in the Women's Super 3s, a tournament designed to bridge the gap between club cricket and international cricket in Ireland. The team was made up of some of the best players in Irish cricket, and were captained by Kim Garth and coached by Chris Siddell. Scorchers won the first edition of the tournament, winning five of their eight matches, with captain Kim Garth winning the Player of the Tournament award. In 2016, Scorchers finished second in the group with two victories in their six games, with strong performances from Lucy O'Reilly and Una Raymond-Hoey, who was selected for the national side off the back of her runs for the side.

2017 brought Scorchers' second title, as they topped the group with seven wins from their ten matches. The following season, 2018, however, Scorchers performed poorly, finishing bottom of the league with three wins. In 2019, Scorchers again won three matches, including both T20s on the final day of competition, this time finishing second in the league.

In 2020 the tournament was reduced to two teams due to the COVID-19 pandemic, with Scorchers now facing off against Typhoons in eight 50 over matches. The two sides each won 4 matches, with Typhoons just edging out Scorchers for the title on Net Run Rate. Scorchers batters Leah Paul and Gaby Lewis led the run-scoring charts in 2020. The 2021 tournament again included just two sides, with Scorchers and Typhoons now playing for separate 50 over and T20 titles. In June, Scorchers won the 50 over section of the tournament, winning four of the seven matches, and in August won the T20 section of the tournament, again with four victories. In 2022, with the tournament expanded back to three teams, Scorchers again won both the 50 over and T20 titles.

Players

Current squad
Based on squad announced for the 2022 season. Players in bold have international caps.

Seasons

Women's Super Series

Honours
 Women's Super Series:
 Winners (6): 2015, 2017, 2021 (50 over), 2021 (T20), 2022 (T20) & 2022 (50 over)

References

Women's cricket teams in Ireland
Women's Super Series